Labedella endophytica is a Gram-positive, aerobic, endophytic and non-motile bacterium from the genus Labedella which has been isolated from the stem of the plant Anabasis elatior from Urumqi in China.

References

Microbacteriaceae
Bacteria described in 2015